Mamina Koné (born 27 December 1988) is an Ivorian taekwondo athlete.

She represented Ivory Coast at the 2016 Summer Olympics in Rio de Janeiro, in the women's +67 kg. She was eliminated by the French athlete Gwladys Épangue in a 3:1 defeat. She was part of am Ivorian team that included Cheick Sallah Cissé and Ruth Gbagbi who both won medals.

References

External links
 

1988 births
Living people
Ivorian female taekwondo practitioners
Olympic taekwondo practitioners of Ivory Coast
Taekwondo practitioners at the 2016 Summer Olympics
African Games bronze medalists for Ivory Coast
African Games medalists in taekwondo
Competitors at the 2011 All-Africa Games
Competitors at the 2015 African Games
21st-century Ivorian women